Alexander Kethel (2 November 1832 – 23 June 1916) was a Scottish-born Australian politician and timber merchant.

Early life
He was born in Perth to carpenter William Kethel and Mary Watson. After a limited education, he was apprenticed to a shoemaker and then went to sea, travelling in the North Sea and the Mediterranean before jumping ship in Sydney in 1853. After working on coastal vessels and in the Victorian goldfields, he returned to Sydney to work at John Booth's sawmill, promoted to foreman and one of three partners leasing the business from 1870. In 1861 he married Mary Ann Yeates; they had seven children. He faced a number of set backs, having been shipwrecked 3 times, then the sawmill burnt down in 1874.

It was as a wholesale timber merchant that he prospered, becoming a wharfinger, leasing the market wharf in Sydney. moving into coastal shipping, including as a ship owner. In 1888 he had a Grand Victorian mansion built on the corner of Glebe Point and Wigram Roads in Glebe which he named Ben Ledi, after the mountain near his birthplace in Scotland.

Political career
He was elected to the New South Wales Legislative Assembly in 1885 for West Sydney. Re-elected as a Free Trader in 1887, he did not re-contest in 1889. In 1892 he was appointed to a Royal Commission, along with William Owen and John Young, to inquire into charges  made by William Schey against Edward Eddy, the Chief Commissioner of Railways. In 1895 he was appointed to the New South Wales Legislative Council, where he remained until his death. He did not hold ministerial or parliamentary office.

Death

References

1832 births
1916 deaths
Members of the New South Wales Legislative Assembly
Members of the New South Wales Legislative Council
Free Trade Party politicians